Davis Valley is an ice-free valley just east of Forlidas Ridge in north-east Dufek Massif, in the Pensacola Mountains of Queen Elizabeth Land, Antarctica. It was mapped by the United States Geological Survey from surveys and U.S. Navy air photos in 1956–66, and was named by the Advisory Committee on Antarctic Names for Edward H. Davis, a construction mechanic with the Ellsworth Station winter party, 1957.

Antarctic Specially Protected Area
Davis Valley and other, adjacent ice-free valleys, forms one of the most southerly ‘dry valley’ systems on the continent and has exceptional scientific value for the interpretation of past glacial events and climate in this part of Antarctica.  With Forlidas Pond some 500 m away, the site is protected under the Antarctic Treaty System as Antarctic Specially Protected Area (ASPA) No.119.

References

 

Valleys of Queen Elizabeth Land
Antarctic Specially Protected Areas